Romania played in the first eight editions of the Rugby World Cup including the inaugural tournament in 1987. They originally qualified for the ninth edition of the Rugby World Cup to be played in 2019. In 2018, after it was discovered that Romania were one of three countries guilty of fielding ineligible players in multiple qualifiers, they received a points deduction. The points deduction meant Romania did not qualify for the 2019 Rugby World Cup.

Summary

By match

1987

1991

1995 Rugby World Cup

1999

2003

2007

2011

2015

Hosting
Romania has not hosted any World Cup games.

References
 
 

Romania national rugby union team
Rugby World Cup by nation